Bissau-Guinean cuisine is the food culture of Guinea-Bissau, a nation on Africa's west coast along the Atlantic Ocean. Rice is a staple in the diet of residents near the coast and millet a staple in the interior. Much of the rice is imported and food insecurity is a problem in large part due to coups, corruption and inflation. Cashews are grown for export. Coconut, palm nut, and olives are also grown.

Fish, shellfish, fruits and vegetables are commonly eaten along with cereal grains, milk, curd and whey. The Portuguese encouraged peanut production. Vigna subterranea (Bambara groundnut) and Macrotyloma geocarpum (Hausa groundnut) are also grown. Black-eyed peas are also part of the diet. Palm oil is harvested.

Common dishes include soups and stews. Common ingredients include yams, sweet potato, cassava, onion, tomato and plantain. Spices, peppers and chilis are used in cooking, including Aframomum melegueta seeds (Guinea pepper).

Celebrations
September 12 is Amilcar Cabral's birthday, a celebration that includes the eating of yassa, chicken prepared with mustard, citrus and onion. Other holidays and festivals include Carnival in February, Colonization Martyr's Day on August 3, Readjustment Movement Day in November, Independence Day on September 24th, Mocidade Day on December 1 and New Year Day.

Family ceremonies to mark birth, circumcision, marriage, and death are celebrated with palm wine or rum. Animal sacrifice is also performed.

Dishes
 Egusi
 Fufu
 Millet couscous
 Dried fish
 Green tea
 Yassa
 Cafriela de frango (grilled spicy chicken)

References

Bissau-Guinean culture
Guinea-Bissau